This is a list of German television related events from 1959.

Events
11 March - West Germany's Kessler Twins finish 8th at the 1959 Eurovision Song Contest in Cannes.

Debuts

ARD
 17 January –  Gesucht wird Mörder X (1959)
 12 February – As Far as My Feet Will Carry Me (1959)
 11 September –  Wir richten ein (1959–1964)
 5 October –  Der Andere (1959)
 11 November – Wer nicht hören will, muß fernsehen...  (1959–1960)

DFF
 20 August –  Blaulicht (1959–1968)
 14 September – Professor Flimmrich (1959–1991)

Ending this year
 Haare hoch! (since 1958)